Owen Vincent Dodson (November 28, 1914 – June 21, 1983) was an American poet, novelist, and playwright. He was one of the leading African-American poets of his time, associated with the generation of black poets following the Harlem Renaissance. He received a fellowship from the Rosenwald Foundation for a series of one-act plays.

Biography
Born in Brooklyn, New York, USA, Dodson studied at Bates College (B.A. 1936) and at the Yale School of Drama (M.F.A. 1939). He taught at Howard University, where he was chair of the Drama Department, from 1940 to 1970, and briefly at Spelman College and Atlanta University. James V. Hatch has explained that Dodson "is the product of two parallel forces—the Black experience in America with its folk and urban routes, and a classical humanistic education."

Dodson's poetry varied widely and covered a broad range of subjects, styles, and forms.  He wrote at times, though rarely, in black dialect, and at others quoted and alluded to classical poetry and drama.  He wrote about religion and about sexuality—he was gay, though he was briefly engaged to Priscilla Heath, a Bates classmate.  One critic describes him as "a brilliant, gay man who discovered his sexual preference early in life, but who was nevertheless unlucky and unhappy in several ill-fated relationships."

He was closely associated with poets W. H. Auden and William Stanley Braithwaite, but his influences were difficult to pin down.  In an interview with Charles H. Rowell, he said:

Well, every writer, at the beginning of his career, is influenced by somebody. Surely it's true that the ragtime rhythms of Langston Hughes and the order of Countee Cullen, his devotion to the church, have influenced me. But you know if you listen to Bach and then listen to the early Haydn you can see a cross between the two--you can see that Bach was influenced by Haydn. Then, if you listen to Haydn at his maturity and then listen to Beethoven, then you can see that Beethoven was influenced at the beginning of his career. And if you listen to the greatest Beethoven and then you listen to the early Brahms, you can see that the early Brahms was influenced by the later Beethoven. Then he became his own style. He got his own idea of life. You admire your father, and you imitate his gestures and his stance--the way he talks, the way he holds his glass, the way he kisses his wife. There is something about him that influences you. But then as you grow older, you begin to get your own style, your own class, your own idea of what is going on. Oh, yes, it's true that Langston Hughes and Countee Cullen influenced me.

In drama, he cited Henrik Ibsen as an influence, though again as an initial relationship later to be reworked and half-forgotten. Dodson's two novels are generally considered to be autobiographical.

Dodson died in 1983 from cardiovascular disease at the age of 69.

Dodson is one of the subjects of Hilton Als' 1996 book The Women; according to Als, Dodson was his mentor and lover.

Works
Poetry:
Powerful Long Ladder (1946)
The Confession Stone: Song Cycles (1970)
Poems from The Confession Stone were set to music by composer Robert Fleming (1968).
The Harlem Book of the Dead (1978). Collaboration with photographer James Van Der Zee and artist Camille Billops.

Plays:
Bayou Legend
Divine Comedy
Till Victory Is Won
New World A-Coming
Garden of Time (1945)
The Confession Stone (1960)

Novels:
Boy at the Window (1951)
Come Home Early, Child (1967)

Papers
Moorland-Spingarn Research Center, Howard University
Countee-Cullen-Harold Jackman Collection, Atlanta University
James Weldon Johnson Collection, Yale University
Hatch-Billops Collection, New York, New York.

References

Further reading
Oxford Companion to African American Literature: Owen Dodson
Joe Weixlmann, "The Rungs of a Powerful Long Ladder: An Owen Dodson Bibliography", Black American Literature Forum 14 (Summer 1980): 60–68.

External links
Tribute by Howard University English Department.
Owen Dodson Collection. Yale Collection of American Literature. Beinecke Rare Book and Manuscript Library.

1914 births
1983 deaths
African-American dramatists and playwrights
20th-century American novelists
Bates College alumni
Deaths from cardiovascular disease
LGBT African Americans
Harlem Renaissance
Writers from Brooklyn
Yale School of Drama alumni
Clark Atlanta University faculty
American LGBT dramatists and playwrights
20th-century American poets
20th-century American dramatists and playwrights
American male novelists
American male poets
American male dramatists and playwrights
20th-century American male writers
Novelists from New York (state)
Novelists from Georgia (U.S. state)
American gay writers
African-American novelists
African-American poets
20th-century African-American writers
20th-century American LGBT people
African-American male writers